This is a list of all tornadoes that were confirmed by local offices of the National Weather Service in the United States from January to February 1973.

United States yearly total

January

January 18 event

January 20 event

January 21 event

January 22 event

January 26 event

January 28 event

January 31 event

February

February 2 event

February 8 event

February 9 event

February 13 event

See also
 Tornadoes of 1973

References

Tornadoes of 1973
1973, 01
January 1973 events in the United States
February 1973 events in the United States